Henry IV Receiving the Spanish Ambassador is an oil on canvas painting in the Troubador style by the French painter Jean-Auguste-Dominique Ingres, executed in 1817. It depicts Henry IV of France playing with his children whilst receiving the Spanish ambassador, with Marie de Medici seated at the centre.

It is now in the Petit Palais, Paris. It was shown in the 2014 exhibition L'invention du Passé. Histoires de cœur et d'épée 1802–1850. at the musée des beaux-arts de Lyon.

External links

1817 paintings
Paintings by Jean-Auguste-Dominique Ingres
Paintings of children
Dogs in art
Paintings in the collection of the Petit Palais
Henry IV of France